The Korfball League & Promotion Division promotion/relegation play-off is played between the number 9 of the England Korfball League and the top 2 teams of the Promotion Division North & West and South & East. The English Korfball Association is the administrator of the play-off.

History

The 2014/2015 edition of the league was won by Tornadoes.

Champions

References

England Korfball League